Tarakeshwar " तारकेश्वर " is a municipality in Kathmandu District in Bagmati Province of Nepal that was established on 2 December 2014 by merging the former Village development committees Dharmasthali, Futung, Goldhunga, Jitpurphedi, Kavresthali, Manmaiju and Sangla. The office of the municipality is that of the former Dharmasthali village development committee.

Population 
Tarakeshwar municipality has a total population of 81,443 according to 2011 Nepal census.

See also 
 Kisandol

References

External links 
 Tarakeshwar

Populated places in Kathmandu District